Chen Ying (born 1 December 1971) is a former Chinese badminton player who competed in the 1996 Summer Olympics. She partnered with Peng Xinyong in Women's doubles. She also won a silver medal in the 1993 IBF World Championships – Women's doubles and a bronze medal in Badminton at the 1994 Asian Games – Women's team.

References

1971 births
Living people
Badminton players at the 1996 Summer Olympics
Chinese female badminton players
Olympic badminton players of China
Asian Games bronze medalists for China
Asian Games medalists in badminton
Badminton players at the 1994 Asian Games
Medalists at the 1994 Asian Games
Chinese emigrants to the United States
Badminton players from Shanghai
20th-century Chinese women